9 (or Nine) is a 2019 Indian Malayalam-language science fiction horror film written and directed by Jenuse Mohamed. It was jointly produced by Prithviraj Productions and SPE Films India (Sony Pictures India), and distributed by Sony Pictures Releasing. The film stars Prithviraj Sukumaran, Alok Krishna, Wamiqa Gabbi, Mamta Mohandas and Prakash Raj in lead roles. The film marks the first regional Indian film production and distribution of Sony Pictures and the debut of Prithviraj Productions.

In the film, a global crisis arises when a comet passes very close to the Earth for 9 days. The film explores Albert Lewis and his son Adam's lives, as a direct result of the comet. 9 was released in India and Gulf Cooperation Council territories on 7 February 2019.

Plot

Dr. Albert Lewis (Prithviraj Sukumaran) is a widowed astrophysicist living in Kerala with his 8-year-old son Adam. He is emotionally distant with his son whom he silently believes to be the reason he lost his beloved wife Annie (Mamta Mohandas) who died in childbirth. His only other kin Annie's brother is hostile with Albert and Adam as he feels Adam is evil and is the cause of a freak accident that rendered his son paralysed while he and Adam were playing on terrace. Adam is shown to be a gloomy but seemingly perceptive boy. He is shown to have run into trouble with  authorities several times and Albert is irked by this too.

A comet from an unknown galaxy is projected to pass beside Earth which will cause a huge electromagnetic pulse (EMP) surge and is predicted to be lasting nine days, during which time none of the modern inventions including electricity, phone, engine-run vehicles will work anywhere in the world. Several days before this phenomenon, Albert's mentor Dr. Inayat Khan (Prakash Raj) visits him at his house and asks him to conduct research about the comet and sends him to a place in the Indian Himalayas, from where the closest citing of the comet is expected. Inayat also says to Albert that this incident is long portrayed by the locals over there and their caves have drawing of the comet with its earlier and future occurrences. Albert, with his colleagues and son, goes to the Himalayas for the research and Albert and Adam opts to stay at an old bungalow owned by Dr.Inayat with Hakka, an old janitor from the local tribe to assist them. Then the story progresses with the appearance of another character named Ava (Wamiqa Gabbi). Adam has bad feelings about Ava, as she tries to trap him. Adam informs this to Albert, but his father doesn't take it right. One time, Adam and Hakka were talking, Ava takes Adam, and haunts him on telling about her to Albert, Hakka on seeing this is injured by Ava. Adam and Albert leave the house. Albert is attacked by Ava and Adam is taken. Albert wakes at Dr. Inayat's where he tells him that Ava is actually Albert and that he has bipolar schizoaffective disorder which explains why Adam was frightened by him in a few scene and tells him he has one day to see Adam alive or else, the police are involved. Adam is found, and Ava leaves as the last night goes, happily leaving the father-son duo. Then, Albert asks Adam who Eva is, causing Adam to gasp, hinting at Ava's existence.
The mid credits scene shows a cave with a painting on its walls, showing a cosmic creature with a female-like appearance tormenting people, indicating that Ava is real.

Cast

 Prithviraj Sukumaran as Dr. Albert Lewis-(Father of Adam and Husband Of Annie) & Lewis-(Dr. Albert's father) (Dual Role)
 Vishal Krishna  as Young Albert
Alok Krishna as Adam-Son of Albert and Annie 
Wamiqa Gabbi as Ava-An unexplainable being who befriends Albert
Mamta Mohandas as Annie Albert Lewis-Dr Alberts Wife Who died while giving birth to Adam 
Prakash Raj as Dr. Inayat Khan
Amalda Liz as Divya
Uday Chandra as Hakka
Tony Luke as Sandeep Murthy
Rahul Madhav as James, Annie's brother and Albert's brother-in-law
Adil Ibrahim as Doctor Rahul, Albert's friend

Production

Development
On 6 November 2016, The Times of India reported that Jenuse Mohamed is set to direct an untitled science fiction horror film written by himself, with Prithviraj Sukumaran signed to play the lead role. Confirming the project to the news-daily, Mohamed said that they are hoping to start filming after March 2017 and the film will be mostly shot in Himachal Pradesh and in Kerala for the remaining portion, also adding Parvathy Thiruvothu and Nithya Menen would be acting beside Prithviraj (both later replaced). In March 2018, Prithviraj announced that the film, titled 9, will be jointly produced by his newly formed production house Prithviraj Productions in partnership with Sony Pictures. The film was reportedly scheduled to begin filming in the following month. 9 marks the debut of Prithviraj Productions and the first regional Indian film of Sony Pictures.

Jenuse wrote the complete screenplay of 9 within a week. He approached Prithviraj in 2016. Prithviraj initially signed the film as an actor and producing the film was not in his mind, but later when he decided to launch a production house with his wife Supriya Menon, they chose 9 as their debut production. Its pre-production began in 2017.

Filming
Principal photography began on 9 April 2018 in Thiruvananthapuram, Kerala. Filming also took place in Kochi. Shooting schedule in Kerala was completed on 18 April. Final scenes in this schedule was shot at Kuttikkanam hill station in Idukki district. Abinandhan Ramanujam was the cinematographer. High precision movie camera was required for filming as almost 60 percent of the film was to be shot at night. Beginning from its second schedule in Manali, Himachal Pradesh, the Red Digital Cinema Gemini 5K camera was used for filming, in its debut use in Indian cinema. The team completed shooting in Spiti Valley by June 2018. Filming was wrapped in Delhi where a song sequence was shot. Principal photography was completed in 48 days. Major part of filming took place in Manali and Spiti Valley. It took more than six months for post-production. Production of the film was completed at a cost lower than the estimated budget.

Music
The film features background score composed by Sekhar Menon and two songs composed by Shaan Rahman. It was released by Sony Music India.

Release
9 was released in India and Gulf Cooperation Council territories on 7 February 2019 by Sony Pictures Releasing.

References

External links
 

2010s Malayalam-language films
2010s science fiction horror films
2019 films
2019 horror thriller films
Films about dissociative identity disorder
Indian horror thriller films
Indian science fiction horror films
Indian science fiction thriller films
Films shot in Thiruvananthapuram
Films shot in Kochi
Films shot in Munnar
Films shot in Himachal Pradesh
Columbia Pictures films
Sony Pictures films
Sony Pictures Networks India films